Michael Edward Ross (October 27, 1965 – July 30, 2016) was an American tintype photographer and lawyer. His photography work spanned 27 years. His last six years were devoted exclusively to wet-plate photography. His focus as an artist was primarily on nude portraits and landscape photography.

History
Ross was born in Ukiah, California to Bill and Dorothy Ross and raised in Davis, California. He attended Jesuit High School in Sacramento, UC San Diego, studied at the London School of Economics, and the UC Hastings School of Law. He worked as senior legal counsel for the Apple computer company in Cupertino, California.

Photography
Ross had taken photographs for 27 years, and during the last eight years of his life used the Collodion process or wet-plates for his work.
 
Ross worked with three different cameras: a half-plate box-style camera made by Ty Guillory, an  bellows-style camera made by Black Art Woodcraft, and a  Chamonix. He used 'period' lenses, manufactured between 1850 and 1900, by Dallmeyer, Voigtlander, and Ross.

Recognition
Ross’ work has been featured in Quite Frankly, juxtapoz.com, and 62nd floor Art Zine issue #9. His talent and unique approach to photography earned him a respectable place among the most creative and innovative photographers.

Death
On July 30, 2016, Ross was killed in a motorcycle accident on a mountain road near Yosemite National Park, while on his way to photograph one of his favorite subjects, the Half Dome in Yosemite Valley.

See also
 Collodion process
 Tintype
 Nude (art)
 Depictions of nudity
 Nude photography

References

External links
 Official Website
 Ed Ross on Facebook
 Ed Ross Photography on Tumblr
 BLUR MAGAZINE: WET PLATE blur-magazine.com
 62nd Floor zine "The Past Lives On Forever"
 Wetplate Photography with Ed Ross gavinhignight.com
 Raw Beauty Gallery - Wet Plates rawbeauty.nl
 Ed Ross on Enkil español
 Dark Beauty Magazine
 Liberator Unzipped
  Blogspot
 

 

1965 births
American portrait photographers
Landscape photographers
2016 deaths
Nude photography